Treatia indica is a species of mite in the family Otopheidomenidae.

References

Rhodacaridae
Articles created by Qbugbot